The 4N71 was a 4-speed automatic transmission from Nissan Motors.  It was available as either a light-duty ("L4N71B") or medium-duty ("E4N71B") unit for rear wheel drive vehicles with longitudinal engines. The latter used an electronically controlled lock up torque converter.

Applications:

L4N71B
Applications:

 1983–1984 Nissan Maxima
 1984–1988 Nissan 200SX
 1984–1989 Dodge/Chrysler Conquest
 1984–1986 Plymouth Conquest
 1984–1988 Mazda RX-7
 1984–1989 Mitsubishi Starion
 1986–1989 Nissan Pathfinder
 1986–1989 Mazda Pickup
 1986–1989 Nissan Pickup
 1986–1990 Nissan Pintara
 1987–1990 Nissan Van

 1990–1993 Mazda Pickup
 1991–1997 Mazda Miata

E4N71B
Applications:

 1984–1989 Nissan 300ZX
 1984–1989 Dodge/Chrysler Conquest
 1986–1990 Nissan Skyline
 1986–1988 Holden Commodore (VL), 3.0-liter models
 1987–1988 Nissan 200SX
 1984–1986 Nissan Laurel
 1986–1987 Nissan Pick Up
 1989–1995 Mazda MPV
 1988– 1996 London Taxi Fairway and Fairway Driver

See also
 List of Jatco transmissions

References
R31 Skyline Club's transmission specifications page

4N71